The University of the West Indies (UWI), originally University College of the West Indies, is a public university system established to serve the higher education needs of the residents of 18 English-speaking countries and territories in the Caribbean: Anguilla, Antigua and Barbuda, The Bahamas, Barbados, Belize, Bermuda, British Virgin Islands, Cayman Islands, Dominica, Grenada, Guyana, Jamaica, Montserrat, Saint Kitts and Nevis, Saint Lucia, Saint Vincent and the Grenadines, Trinidad and Tobago, and Turks and Caicos Islands.
Each country is either a member of the Commonwealth of Nations or a British Overseas Territory. The aim of the university is to help "unlock the potential for economic and cultural growth" in the West Indies, thus allowing improved regional autonomy. The university was originally instituted as an independent external college of the University of London.

The university has produced students who have excelled in a number of disciplines such as the arts and sciences, business, politics, and sports. Notable alumni and faculty include three Nobel Laureates, 72 Rhodes Scholars, three Gates Cambridge Scholarship winners, one Emmy award winner, one Man Booker Prize winner, one American Book Award winner, multiple Commonwealth Short Story Prize winners, 18 current or former Caribbean Heads of Government, two Olympic gold medallists, among other award winners. The university's cricket team previously participated in West Indian domestic cricket, but now participates as part of a Combined Campuses and Colleges team.

The UWI campus in Mona, Jamaica serves as the headquarters of the UWI system. Aside from UWI Mona, UWI has four major university centres: UWI Cave Hill (Barbados), UWI St. Augustine (Trinidad and Tobago), UWI Five Islands (Antigua and Barbuda), and the regional UWI Open Campus in the UWI-funding Caribbean nations.

History 

The university was founded in 1948, on the recommendation of the Asquith Commission through its sub-committee on the West Indies,  chaired by Sir James Irvine. The Asquith Commission had been established in 1943 to review the provision of higher education in the British colonies. Initially in a special relationship with the University of London, the then University College of the West Indies (UCWI) was seated at Mona, about five miles from Kingston, Jamaica. The university was based at Gibraltar Camp, used by evacuated Gibraltarians during the war.

Seeking to address a need for medical care, the first faculty established a medical school. The foundation stone for a hospital was added in 1949, and the University College Hospital of the West Indies opened in 1953. On 18 January 1953, Sir Winston Churchill visited the hospital and unveiled a plaque in recognition of the contribution made by the government of the United Kingdom to the hospital. The hospital was renamed the University Hospital of the West Indies in 1967 when the university gained full university status. In addition to patient care, the hospital facilitates research and teaching, along with the Medical Services department of the Mona campus of the University of the West Indies.

The University College achieved independent university status in 1962. The St. Augustine Campus in Trinidad, formerly the Imperial College of Tropical Agriculture (ICTA), was established in 1960, followed by a school established along University Row, at the Deep Water Harbour of Barbados in 1963, later seated at the present Cave Hill Campus in 1967. The Open Campus, University Centres, headed by a Resident Tutor, were established in each of the other 13 contributing territories thereafter.

In 1950, Princess Alice, Countess of Athlone, Queen Victoria's last surviving granddaughter, became the first Chancellor of the University College of the West Indies.

Sir William Arthur Lewis was the first Vice-Chancellor under the UWI's independent Charter. A native of St Lucia, he served as the first West Indian Principal of the UCWI from 1958 to 1960 and as Vice-Chancellor from 1960 to 1963. He was succeeded by Sir Philip Sherlock (a Jamaican and one of UWI's founding fathers) who served as Vice-Chancellor from 1963 to 1969. Sir Roy Marshall, a Barbadian, was the next Vice-Chancellor, serving from 1969 to 1974. He was succeeded in that year by Dr Aston Zachariah Preston, a Jamaican, who died in office on 24 June 1986. The fifth Vice-Chancellor was Sir Alister McIntyre, who served from 1988 to 1998, followed by alumnus and Professor Emeritus Rex Nettleford, who served from 1998 to 2004. The current Vice-Chancellor is Professor Sir Hilary Beckles, who succeeded Professor E. Nigel Harris in May 2015.

The University of the West Indies Museum catalogs and exhibits some of the university's history.

University of the West Indies system 
The UWI is the largest, longest-serving education provider in the Commonwealth Caribbean, with five constituent campuses:

The following are the satellite campuses of the university system:
 Mount Hope Campus in Mount Hope, Trinidad and Tobago (houses the Faculty of Medical Sciences of UWI St. Augustine)
 St. Augustine South Campus at Debe in the Penal–Debe region, Trinidad and Tobago (extension campus of UWI St. Augustine)
 Western Jamaica Campus in Montego Bay, Jamaica (extension campus of UWI Mona)
 Centre for Hotel and Tourism Management in Nassau, Bahamas (extension campus of UWI Mona)
 School of Clinical Medicine and Research in Nassau, Bahamas (extension of the medical programme at UWI St. Augustine)

The other contributing countries are served by the Open Campus.

Proposed additions 
There have been various proposals to add one or more campuses on other islands, including a campus at Hope, Grenada.

Articulation and franchised programmes 
In addition to programmes offered directly by one of the faculties of the university, the UWI extends accessibility to its programmes through articulation agreements and franchise arrangements with regional institutions. In many of these arrangements, students are able to study in their home countries for the first one or two years before going to a landed campus for the third (and fourth) year. In the case of articulation agreements, the local institution develops its own programme and the UWI agrees to recognise it as equivalent to the first year or two of a specific UWI programme. In the case of a franchise programme, the local institution delivers exactly the programme as offered by UWI. This is usually the first year or two, but can be the full bachelor's degree on occasion.

Global initiatives 
The University of the West Indies has initiated several international partnerships. In 2016, UWI and the Global Institute for Software Technology (GIST) established the UWI-China Institute for Information Technology. Starting in the summer of 2018, students in the programme on the Cave Hill and Mona campuses will travel to Suchou, China for two years to study software engineering and Mandarin.

The UWI-SUNY Center for Leadership and Sustainable Development (CLSD) was established in 2017 on SUNY's Empire State campus in Manhattan.
The centre is designed to assist the Commonwealth Caribbean in meeting the United Nations Sustainable Development Goals. In addition to research and advocacy, plans are underway to offer a joint master's degree in sustainability and leadership.

In 2017, the University of Lagos (UNILAG) and the UWI established the UNILAG-UWI Institute of African and Diaspora Studies.  The institute conducts research and offers a master's degree in African and Diaspora Studies.

Also in 2017, UWI and the University of Johannesburg (UJ) signed a memorandum of agreement (MoA) to establish the Institute for Global Africa Affairs. The institute was launched in 2018 and will offer a joint master's degree in Global African Studies.

In 2020, UWI and the University of Havana inked an agreement to jointly establish the Institute for the Sustainable Development of the Caribbean. UWI Mona will lead the initiative from the UWI side, with the deans of the Faculty of Science and Technology and the Dean of the Faculty of Medical Sciences taking the lead.

In 2021 the Inter-American Development Bank decided to become a stakeholder of UWI under Cuban-American President Mauricio Claver-Carone as a public-private partnerships, [PPP).

Faculties 
The University of the West Indies is a multi-campus, international university with several faculties and schools, some of which are replicated on all four physical main campuses. The Open Campus does not have a faculty structure. The distribution of the faculties (called schools at Five Islands) is listed below.

A new Faculty of Culture, Creative and Performing Arts has been approved to be established on 1 August 2020 at the Cave Hill Campus.

Faculty of Medical Sciences 
Prior to the establishment of a medical school in the Caribbean, most doctors were trained in the United Kingdom, with a smaller group trained in the United States of America. This was costly, not attuned to the specific needs of the communities the doctors would serve, and risked the trained doctors remaining in their countries of training.

The Faculty of Medical Sciences was the first faculty to be established in the then University College. This is because of the pressing need for more (locally trained) doctors to treat conditions such as tuberculosis, yaws, tetanus, typhoid, infant malnutrition and illnesses related to diarrhea. The establishment of medical schools in the colonies was replicated in the Gold Coast, Nigeria, Rhodesia and Uganda. The inaugural entering class in 1948 consisted of 33 students from across the Caribbean, selected from more than 600 or almost 800 applicants. As the university college was then affiliated with the University of London, the curriculum reflected University of London's curriculum, with the addition of preventative and tropical medicine. Degrees were awarded under the University of London name until 1962, reflective of the role the university played in administering the programme and providing the teaching staff. In addition to the standard five-year course, a pre-course science year was required for students without adequate preparation in that area. The University Hospital of the West Indies, an acute tertiary hospital, provided the initial context for clinical education.

Expansion of the capacity of the Faculty followed several steps. In addition to population growth, the exodus of medical graduates to North America, never to return, exacerbated the need to increase the output of doctors. In the 1960s, it was possible to complete the clinical clerkship element of training in Trinidad and Tobago (at the Port of Spain General Hospital) and in Barbados (at the Queen Elizabeth Hospital), as well as in Jamaica. In 1989, the medical school at the St. Augustine campus opened. However, rather than adopt the 'traditional' existing curriculum at the Mona school, it adopted a problem-based approach. Mona, which had already carried out some curricular reform due to World Health Organization recommendations to place greater emphasis on community health promotion and protection, and St. Augustine, had different medical school curricula, though the graduates took the same qualifying exams. Moreover, St. Augustine's Faculty of Medical Sciences included not just a School of Medicine, but also Schools of Dentistry, Veterinarian Medicine, Nursing and Pharmacy, which necessitated some sharing of resources. In 2008, the clerkships in Barbados were fully developed into a medical school at the Cave Hill campus. Around the same time, the UWI School of Clinical Medicine and Research was established from an existing programme allowing clerkships to be undertaken in Nassau, under the direction of the St. Augustine campus.  The School offers the final two years of the five-year programme.

Specialist medical training 
Similar to the general training, specialist training was progressively made available through the UWI. For example, anaesthesia was initially provided by untrained doctors, nurses, and pharmacists, leading to high morbidity and mortality rates. Initially, doctors were sent overseas for a year of post-graduate training. While the Faculty was established in 1948, the one-year post-graduate diploma in anaesthetics did not begin until 1966 at the Mona Campus. St. Augustine and Cave Hill added the diploma in 1976. However, Mona was already moving towards a four-year Doctor of Medicine Anaesthetics degree, first offered in 1974. Eventually, this more specialised degree (extended to include intensive care) was extended to the other two campuses in 1984 while the one-year programme was discontinued in 1994.

While improvements were being made to the training of physicians as anaesthesiologists, there continued to be a shortage of trained personnel in rural areas. In Jamaica, an initiative to train nurse anaesthetists started, with nurses first sent to the US and to Cuba, followed by the establishment of the Jamaica School of Nurse Anaesthetists in 1981, which continues to this day (2019) with the Ministry of Health. This is in addition to specialised additional training for nurses in intensive care which began in 1969.

Dentist training 
Two of the three faculties of medical sciences offer dentistry. The St. Augustine campus was the first to offer a dental school. It opened in 1989, the first dental school in the anglophone Caribbean. The inaugural class of roughly 20 students was mostly from Trinidad and Tobago, with a couple of students each from Jamaica and St. Vincent and the Grenadines. The initial curriculum was modeled on that found in the UK, with the intention to seek recognition from British authorities. It is possible to the exam for membership of the Faculty of Dental Surgery of the Edinburgh-based Royal College of Surgeons.

Accreditation 
Starting in 2004, the medical programmes in the Caribbean ceased to be accredited by the United Kingdom-based General Medical Council, as the UK re-focussed more on integration with Europe. UWI was a key player in the establishment of the Caribbean Accreditation Authority for Education in Medicine and other Health Professions (CAAM-HP). The three UWI medical schools are accredited together, despite differences in curriculum, and are currently accredited with conditions. The dental school at St. Augustine is probationary accredited while the dental school at Mona has accreditation with conditions. The veterinarian medical school at St. Augustine is also accredited with conditions. Efforts are underway to align the curriculum and admission standards of the three medical schools.

Regional competition 
Even with expansion, the UWI medical schools are facing new competition. Many for-profit medical schools have been established in the Caribbean region, with the first established in Grenada in 1976. Generally, these schools cater to students from the United States but they sometimes offer scholarships to local students, providing an alternative to UWI programmes or going abroad for medical education to Canada, the United Kingdom or the United States. The quality of these offshore medical schools differ, though some are accredited by the CAAM-HP.

Research 
The Faculty of Medicines has a research arm called the Caribbean Institute for Health Research (CAIHR), formerly the Tropical Medicine Research Institute (TMRI). The CAIHR comprises the George Alleyne Chronic Disease Research Centre, based on the Cave Hill Campus, and three units all based on the Mona Campus: the Tropical Metabolism Research Unit, the Sickle Cell Unit and the Epidemiology Research Unit. Continuing medical education is provided in different ways among the various countries with the medical associations taking the lead in some countries and the medical schools in others.

Faculty of Law 
Prior to the establishment of the Faculty of Law at the UWI, residents of the anglophone Caribbean would travel primarily to the United Kingdom to study. There, a prospective lawyer would join one of the Inns of Court, receiving lodging and training and undergoing examinations. The training focused on the legal system and social context of England, which did not correspond to legal practice in the Caribbean. It was also expensive. For the legal profession in England, the influx of prospective lawyers from around the British Commonwealth was beginning to strain resources. Efforts were underway to limit foreign students in legal studies in England, and this was another reason to establish legal training in the Caribbean.

The Faculty of Law was initially established in 1970 at the Cave Hill Campus, in Barbados, but the first year of the degree was available at each campus (and the University of Guyana in Guyana).  This structure served, inter alia, to create a regional institution (the Faculty) and a regional identity within the profession. Incrementally, courses from the second and third year of the law programmes were introduced at St. Augustine and Mona, allowing students to take more and more of the degree on those campuses, rather than having to study at Cave Hill. It is now possible to complete the law degree at each campus.

Following completion of the UWI law degree, graduates who intend to practice must complete a two-year practical professional training programme at one of three law schools in the Caribbean. The Eugene Dupuch Law School in The Bahamas is normally for citizens of the Bahamas, the British Virgin Islands and the Turks and Caicos Islands. The Norman Manley Law School in Jamaica has allocated citizens from Anguilla, Antigua and Barbuda, Belize, Jamaica, Montserrat, and St. Kitts and Nevis. The Hugh Wooding Law School in Trinidad and Tobago serves Barbados, Dominica, Grenada, Guyana, St. Lucia, St. Vincent and the Grenadines, and Trinidad and Tobago. The three schools were established by the Caribbean Council of Legal Education. Ironically, despite the Faculty of Law having been founded in Barbados, that country does not have a law school, though one has been suggested.

The first law students, beginning studies in October 1970, consisted of 24 students in Jamaica, nineteen in Trinidad and Tobago, 35 in Barbados, and thirteen Guyana. Two years later, almost 300 students were enrolled in the Faculty. The first graduates entered the profession in 1975.

Access to the Faculty of Law and to the Law Schools are controlled by the institutions. However, costs can vary depending on whether the applicant's country has paid contributory grants to the Faculty or the School. Not all countries did. Therefore, applicants from non-contributing countries would be considered after those from contributing countries and their fees would be higher.

Faculty of Sport 
Launched in 2017, the UWI Faculty of Sport integrates teaching and research, professional development, community partnerships, and co- and extra-curricular student sport through three main units: Professional Programmes, Outreach & Projects Unit, Co-curricular & Intramural-Activity Unit and the Academic Programme & Activity Unit. The faculty is made up of four Academies of Sport: Cave Hill Academy of Sport, Open Campus Academy of Sport, Mona Academy of Sport and St Augustine Academy of Sport.

UWI Press 
Founded in 1992, the University of the West Indies Press is a department within The University of the West Indies system located in Jamaica.  Supported by a regionally assembled board or directors, UWI Press acts as the overall publishing arm of the main UWI campuses, and its faculty and student body of the Open Campus where it additionally serves the diverse network of 17 countries and territories.  As an entity that caters to a readership around the world, UWI Press maintains a main commitment to traditional fields of: Caribbean history, social sciences, political science and cultural studies.

Rankings 
In the 2021 Times Higher Education World University Rankings, UWI ranked in the 401-500th band. and in 2023, ranked in the top 150 best universities in the world for best research impact. The 2021-2022 Times Higher Education ranking ranks UWI in the top 20 when compared with Latin American University rankings, and ranks UWI first in the Caribbean. In 2020, UWI ranked among the top 100 Golden Age University Rankings and Impact Rankings. UWI is the only Caribbean university to make these prestigious lists.

Chancellors of the University 
 Princess Alice, Countess of Athlone, 1948–71
Sir Hugh Wooding, 1971–74
 Sir Allen Montgomery Lewis 1974–89
 Sir Shridath Ramphal 1989–2003
 Sir George Alleyne 2003–2017
 Robert Bermudez 2017– current

Vice-Chancellors of the University 
Principals

 Sir Thomas Taylor 1947–52 
 Walter Wyatt Grave 1953–58
 Sir William Arthur Lewis 1958–60

Vice-Chancellors

 Sir William Arthur Lewis 1960–63
 Sir Philip Sherlock 1963–69
 Sir O Roy Marshall 1969–74
 Hon Dr Aston Zachariah Preston 1974–86
 Pro-vice-chancellor L R B Robinson acting 1986–88
 Sir Alister McIntyre 1988–1998
 Rex Nettleford 1998–2004
 Eon Nigel Harris 2004–2015
 Hilary Beckles 2015–

Notable faculty and administrators 
Helen Asemota: professor of biochemistry and biotechnology
Courtenay Bartholomew: the first lecturer and then Professor of Medicine at UWI St Augustine.
V. C. R. A. C. Crabbe: Professor of Legislative Drafting, formerly justice of the Supreme Court of Ghana, and first Electoral Commissioner of Ghana. 
Leith Dunn Head of the Mona Unit
Albert K Fiadjoe: Distinguished emeritus professor of public law.
Elsa Goveia: first female professor of UCWI and noted pioneer in West Indian historiography.
 Bridget Jones (1935–2000): pioneering Literature and language professor from 1964 to 1982, who developed curricula to include Afro-, Anglo- and Franco-Caribbean writers in university syllabai at UWI and in Britain and Ireland.
 Dorothy King: head of the Microbiology Department of the medical faculty from 1973 to 2001.
 Elsa Leo-Rhynie: Principal of the Mona campus.
 William Arthur Lewis: economist, lecturer, author and joint winner of Nobel Memorial Prize in Economics of 1979.
 Albert Belville Lockhart:  Consultant and Ophthalmologist, Recipient of the Jamaican Order of Merit, co-inventor of Canasol.
 Evelyn O'Callaghan: Professor of West Indian literature, Dean of the Faculty of Humanities and Education.
 Orlando Patterson: John Cowles Professor of Sociology at Harvard University.
 George Maxwell Richards: Pro Vice Chancellor and Principal of the St. Augustine campus.
Maureen Warner-Lewis: Professor Emerita of African-Caribbean Language and Orature; Gold Musgrave Medal winner in 2009.
 Manley Elisha West: Professor of Pharmacology, recipient of the Jamaican Order of Merit, co-inventor of Canasol.
 J. H. Parry :Gardiner Professor of Oceanic History and Affairs at Harvard University
 Raymond Gosling
 Richard D'Aeth: President of Hughes Hall, Cambridge University
 Michael B. Bracken
 Gordon Shirley pro vice chancellor and principal

Notable alumni 

UWI graduates who are, or have been, heads of government:
 Vance Amory, former premier of Nevis
 Kenny Anthony, former prime minister of St. Lucia
 Owen Arthur, former prime minister of Barbados
 Dean Barrow, former prime minister of Belize
 Heather Doram, activist and educator who designed Antigua and Barbuda's national costume
 Denzil Douglas, former prime minister of St. Kitts & Nevis
 Rufus Ewing, premier of the Turks and Caicos Islands
 Bruce Golding, former prime minister of Jamaica
 Ralph Gonsalves, prime minister of St. Vincent and the Grenadines
 David A. Granger, president of Guyana
 Timothy Harris, prime minister of St. Kitts & Nevis
 Andrew Holness, prime minister of Jamaica
 Patrick Manning, former prime minister of Trinidad and Tobago
 Hubert Minnis, prime minister of The Bahamas
 Keith Mitchell, prime minister of Grenada
 Joseph Walcott Parry, former premier of Nevis
 P. J. Patterson, former prime minister of Jamaica
 Kamla Persad-Bissessar, first female prime minister of Trinidad and Tobago
 Philip J. Pierre, prime minister of Saint Lucia
 Keith Rowley, current prime minister of Trinidad and Tobago
 Lloyd Erskine Sandiford, former prime minister of Barbados
 Kennedy A. Simmonds, former prime minister of St. Kitts & Nevis
 Orlando Smith, chief minister of the British Virgin Islands
 Freundel Stuart, former prime minister of Barbados
 Tillman Thomas, former prime minister of Grenada
 David Thompson, former prime minister of Barbados

Graduates in other fields:
 Dame Anita Allen, president of the Court of Appeal of The Bahamas
 Faris Al-Rawi, former Attorney General of Trinidad and Tobago
 Pamela Coke-Hamilton Director of International Trade for UNCTAD 
 Merceline Dahl-Regis, Bahamian physician, former Chief Medical Officer of the Bahamas
 Edwidge Danticat, Haitian poet and writer
 Tracy Davidson-Celestine, former political leader of the Tobago Council of the People's National Movement and Trinidad and Tobago Ambassador to Costa Rica
 Kwame Dawes, Ghanaian poet and critic, and Professor of English at the University of Nebraska-Lincoln
 Erna Brodber, Jamaican writer, sociologist and social activist 
 Kevin Fenton, President of the United Kingdom Faculty of Public Health
 Karen E. Nelson
 Merle Collins, Poet
 Mercedes Richards, Jamaican astrophysics and astronomy professor
 Fae Ellington, Jamaican media personality and lecturer
 Wendy Fitzwilliam, Miss Universe 1998
 Shelly-Ann Fraser-Pryce, Olympic Gold Medallist
 Marcia Gilbert-Roberts, Jamaican bureaucrat and diplomat who served as Jamaican Ambassador to several European countries including Germany, Spain and France
 Burton P. C. Hall, judge of the International Criminal Tribunal for the Former Yugoslavia and former Chief Justice of The Bahamas
 Lisa Hanna, Miss World 1993
 Marlon James, Jamaican-born winner of the 2015 Man Booker Prize
 Jerelle Joseph, academic and scientist
 Giselle Laronde, Miss World 1986
 Joan Latchman, Director of the University of the West Indies Seismic Research Centre
 Ianthea Leigertwood-Octave, former judge of the Eastern Caribbean Supreme Court
 Garvin Medera, CEO of Caribbean Airlines
 Charles W. Mills, philosopher
 Dolliver Nelson, member of the International Tribunal for the Law of the Sea
 Hansle Parchment, Olympic Gold Medallist
 Kris Rampersad, journalist, author, cultural advocate
 Shorna-Kay Richards, Jamaican diplomat
 Patrick Lipton Robinson, judge of the International Court of Justice
 Walter Rodney, Guyanese historian and political activist
 Richard Sealy, Barbadian Tourism Minister
 Olive Senior, Jamaican novelist and writer
 Antoinette Tidjani Alou, lecturer in Comparative Literature at Abdou Moumouni University in Niger
 Shafimana Ueitele, Namibian lawyer 
 Derek Walcott, recipient of the 1992 Nobel Prize for Literature

See also 

 Agence Universitaire de la Francophonie
 Association of Commonwealth Universities
 University of the West Indies Museum
 University of Guyana
 University of Trinidad and Tobago
 University of Technology, Jamaica
 University of the Bahamas
 University of the French West Indies
 University of French Guiana
 Savacou, a sculpture on the Mona site
 University of the South Pacific, a similar university for Pacific Island states
 Historically black colleges and universities
 American University of Barbados

References

Notes 
 Serves the 16 campus funding countries.

External links

 

 
Universities in Jamaica
Universities and colleges in the Caribbean
University
Educational institutions established in 1948
1948 establishments in the British Empire
Buildings and structures in Saint Andrew Parish, Jamaica
Universities and colleges in British Overseas Territories